Balanoglossus australiensis is a species of  long acorn worm in Ptychoderidae family which can be found in Gulf of Carpentaria, New Zealand, Australian cities such as Hawkesbury and Manning as well as Solomon Archipelago and its sea.

References

Enteropneusta
Animals described in 1894
Invertebrates of Australia